The 1976 Commercial Union Assurance Masters  was a tennis tournament played on indoor carpet courts at The Summit in Houston in the United States. It was the 7th edition of the Masters Grand Prix and was held from December 7 through December 12, 1976. Manuel Orantes won the singles Masters title and $40,000 first-prize money.

Finals

Singles

 Manuel Orantes defeated  Wojtek Fibak 5–7, 6–2, 0–6, 7–6(7–1), 6–1

Doubles

 Sherwood Stewart /  Fred McNair defeated  Brian Gottfried /  Raúl Ramírez, 6–3, 5–7, 5–7, 6–4, 6–4.

References

 
Grand Prix tennis circuit year-end championships
Tennis tournaments in the United States
Commercial Union Assurance Masters, 1976
Commercial Union Assurance Masters, 1976
Sports competitions in Houston
Commercial Union Assurance Masters